The Trinitas Cross is a cross-shaped antenna with a height of  located on a hill near the Păun village in Bârnova, Iași County. Due to its height and because it is lit at night, the cross is visible from almost any point of Iași and tens of kilometers away, even in places to the left of the Prut River in Moldova.

History
At the initiative of Patriarch Daniel of Romania in July 2006, on the hill near the Păun village, the work began on the raising of a metal cross which would have at its top a broadcast antenna of Radio Trinitas (a radio station founded in 1998 by the then-Metropolitan Daniel). The monument was erected in accordance with regulations, and taking into consideration the fact that all aircraft landing at Iași International Airport pass over the hill. It was raised by a large-capacity crane specially brought from Bacău. At midnight on 21 to 22 August 2006, a synod of 30 priests led by the Patriarch Daniel of Romania consecrated the cross-shaped antenna that would allow some more remote localities of the Iași County to receive the Trinitas radio on a radius of 100 km.

In the years after the inauguration, two pilgrimages were organized to the Trinitas Cross on the Păun Hill, on September 14, 2006 and on July 29, 2007.

See also
Romanian People's Salvation Cross

References

Buildings and structures completed in 2006
Buildings and structures in Iași County
Monuments and memorials in Romania
Towers in Romania
Transmitter sites in Romania
Monumental crosses
2006 establishments in Romania